Alliance 90/The Greens, often simply referred to as the Greens, is a green political party in Germany. It was formed in 1993 as the merger of The Greens (formed in West Germany in 1980) and Alliance 90 (formed in East Germany in 1990). The Greens had itself merged with the East German Green Party after German reunification in 1990.

Since January 2022, Ricarda Lang and Omid Nouripour have been co-leaders of the party. It currently holds 118 of the 736 seats in the Bundestag, having won 14.8% of votes cast in the 2021 federal election, and its parliamentary group is the third largest of six. Its parliamentary co-leaders are Britta Haßelmann and Katharina Dröge. The Greens have been part of the federal government during two periods: first as a junior partner to the Social Democrats (SPD) from 1998 to 2005, and again with the SPD and the FDP following the 2021 German federal election. In the incumbent Scholz cabinet, the Greens have five ministers, including Vice-Chancellor Robert Habeck and Foreign Minister Annalena Baerbock.

The party holds seats in all of Germany's sixteen state legislatures except the Saarland, and is a member of coalition governments in eleven states. Winfried Kretschmann, Minister-President of Baden-Württemberg, is the only Green head of government in Germany. The Landtag of Baden-Württemberg is also the only state legislature in which Alliance 90/The Greens is the largest party; it is the second largest party in the legislatures of Bavaria, Berlin, Hamburg, Hesse, and Schleswig-Holstein.

Alliance 90/The Greens is a founding member of the European Green Party and the Greens–European Free Alliance group in the European Parliament. It is currently the largest party in the G/EFA group, with 21 MEPs. In the 2019 European election, Alliance 90/The Greens was the second largest party in Germany, winning 20.5% of votes cast. The party had 126,451 members in December 2022, making it the fourth largest party in Germany by membership.

Former names and variants in the states
The Green Party was initially founded in West Germany as Die Grünen (the Greens) in January 1980. It grew out of the anti-nuclear energy, environmental, peace, new left, and new social movements of the late 20th century.

Grüne Liste Umweltschutz (green list for environmental protection) was the name used for some branches in Lower Saxony and other states in the Federal Republic of Germany. These groups were founded in 1977 and took part in several elections. Most of them merged with The Greens in 1980.

The West Berlin state branch of The Greens was founded as Alternative Liste, or precisely, Alternative Liste für Demokratie und Umweltschutz (AL; alternative list for democracy and environmental protection) in 1978 and became the official West Berlin branch of The Greens in 1980. In 1993 it renamed to Alliance 90/The Greens Berlin after the merger with East Berlin's Greens and Alliance 90.

The Hamburg state branch of the Green Party was called Grün-Alternative Liste Hamburg (GAL; green-alternative list) from its foundation in 1982 until 2012. In 1984 it became the official Hamburg branch of The Greens.

History

12–13 January 1980: Foundation congress
The political party The Greens sprung out of the wave of New Social Movements that were active in the 1970s, including environmentalist, anti-war, and anti-nuclear movements which can trace their origin to the student protests of 1968. Officially founded as a German national party on 13 January 1980 in Karlsruhe, the party sought to give these movements political and parliamentary representation, as the pre-existing peoples parties were not organised in a way to address their stated issues. Its membership included organisers from former attempts to achieve institutional representation such as GLU and AUD. Opposition to pollution, use of nuclear power, NATO military action, and certain aspects of industrialised society were principal campaign issues. The party also championed sexual liberation and the abolition of age of consent laws.

The formation of a party was purportedly first discussed by movement leaders in 1978. Important figures in the first years were – among others – Petra Kelly, Joschka Fischer, Gert Bastian, Lukas Beckmann, Rudolf Bahro, Joseph Beuys, Antje Vollmer, Herbert Gruhl, August Haußleiter, Luise Rinser, Dirk Schneider, Christian Ströbele, Jutta Ditfurth, and Baldur Springmann.

In the foundational congress of 1980, the ideological tenets of the party were consolidated, proclaiming the famous Four Pillars of the Green Party:
 Social justice
 Ecological wisdom
 Grassroots democracy
 Nonviolence

1980s: Parliamentary representation on the federal level
In 1982, the conservative factions of the Greens broke away to form the Ecological Democratic Party (ÖDP). Those who remained in the Green party were more strongly pacifist and against restrictions on immigration and reproductive rights, while supporting the legalisation of cannabis use, placing a higher priority on working for LGBT rights, and tending to advocate what they described as "anti-authoritarian" concepts of education and child-rearing. They also tended to identify more closely with a culture of protest and civil disobedience, frequently clashing with police at demonstrations against nuclear weapons, nuclear energy, and the construction of a new runway at Frankfurt Airport. Those who left the party at the time might have felt similarly about some of these issues, but did not identify with the forms of protest that Green party members took part in.

Among the important political issues at the time was the deployment of Pershing II IRBMs and nuclear-tipped cruise missiles by the U.S. and NATO on West German soil, generating strong opposition in the general population that found an outlet in mass demonstrations. The newly formed party was able to draw on this popular movement to recruit support. Around this time, Joschka Fischer emerged as the unofficial leader of the party, which he remained until resigning all leadership posts following the 2005 federal election.

The Greens were the target of attempts by the East German secret police to enlist the cooperation of members who were willing to align the party with the agenda of the German Democratic Republic. The party ranks included several politicians who were later discovered to have been Stasi agents, including Bundestag representative Dirk Schneider, European Parliament representative Brigitte Heinrich, and Red Army Faction defense lawyer Klaus Croissant. A study commissioned by the Greens determined that 15 to 20 members intimately cooperated with the Stasi and another 450 to 500 had been informants.

This faction campaigned for repealing  § 176 of the German penal code, dealing with child sexual abuse. This group was controversial within the party itself, and was seen as partly responsible for the poor election result of 1985. This controversy re-surfaced in 2013 and chairwoman Claudia Roth stated she welcomed an independent scientific investigation on the extent of influence pedophile activists had on the party in the mid-1980s. In November 2014 the political scientist Franz Walter presented the final report about his research on a press conference.

1990s: German reunification, electoral failure in the West, formation of Alliance 90/The Greens

In the 1990 federal elections, taking place post-reunified Germany, the Greens in the West did not pass the 5% limit required to win seats in the Bundestag. It was only due to a temporary modification of German election law, applying the five-percent "hurdle" separately in East and West Germany, that the Greens acquired any parliamentary seats at all. This happened because in the new states of Germany, the Greens, in a joint effort with Alliance 90, a heterogeneous grouping of civil rights activists, were able to gain more than 5% of the vote. Some critics attribute this poor performance to the reluctance of the campaign to cater to the prevalent mood of nationalism, instead focusing on subjects such as global warming. A campaign poster at the time proudly stated, "Everyone is talking about Germany; we're talking about the weather!", paraphrasing a popular slogan of Deutsche Bundesbahn, the German national railway. The party also opposed imminent reunification that was in process, instead wanting to initiate debates on ecology and nuclear issues before reunification causing a drop in support in Western Germany. After the 1994 federal election; however, the merged party returned to the Bundestag, and the Greens received 7.3% of the vote nationwide and 49 seats.

1998–2002: Greens as governing party, first term

In the 1998 federal election, despite a slight fall in their percentage of the vote (6.7%), the Greens retained 47 seats and joined the federal government for the first time in 'Red-Green' coalition government with the Social Democratic Party of Germany (SPD). Joschka Fischer became Vice-Chancellor of Germany and foreign minister in the new government, which had two other Green ministers (Andrea Fischer, later Renate Künast, and Jürgen Trittin).

Almost immediately the party was plunged into a crisis by the question of German participation in the NATO actions in Kosovo. Numerous anti-war party members resigned their party membership when the first post-war deployment of German troops in a military conflict abroad occurred under a Red-Green government, and the party began to experience a long string of defeats in local and state-level elections. Disappointment with the Green participation in government increased when anti-nuclear power activists realised that shutting down the nation's nuclear power stations would not happen as quickly as they wished, and numerous pro-business SPD members of the federal cabinet opposed the environmentalist agenda of the Greens, calling for tacit compromises.

In 2001, the party experienced a further crisis as some Green Members of Parliament refused to back the government's plan of sending military personnel to help with the 2001 invasion of Afghanistan. Chancellor Gerhard Schröder called a vote of confidence, tying it to his strategy on the war. Four Green MPs and one Social Democrat voted against the government, but Schröder was still able to command a majority.

On the other hand, the Greens achieved a major success as a governing party through the 2000 decision to phase out the use of nuclear energy. Minister of Environment, Nature Conservation and Nuclear Safety Jürgen Trittin reached an agreement with energy companies on the gradual phasing out of the country's nineteen nuclear power plants and a cessation of civil usage of nuclear power by 2020. This was authorised through the Nuclear Exit Law. Based on an estimate of 32 years as the normal period of operation for a nuclear power plant, the agreement defines precisely how much energy a power plant is allowed to produce before being shut down. This law has since been overturned.

2002–2005: Greens as governing party, second term
Despite the crises of the preceding electoral period, in the 2002 federal election, the Greens increased their total to 55 seats (in a smaller parliament) and 8.6%. This was partly due to the perception that the internal debate over the war in Afghanistan had been more honest and open than in other parties, and one of the MPs who had voted against the Afghanistan deployment, Hans-Christian Ströbele, was directly elected to the Bundestag as a district representative for the Friedrichshain-Kreuzberg – Prenzlauer Berg East constituency in Berlin, becoming the first Green to ever gain a first-past-the-post seat in Germany.

The Greens benefited from increased inroads among traditionally left-wing demographics which had benefited from Green-initiated legislation in the 1998–2002 term, such as environmentalists (Renewable Energies Act) and LGBT groups (Registered Partnership Law). Perhaps most important for determining the success of both the Greens and the SPD was the increasing threat of war in Iraq, which was highly unpopular with the German public, and helped gather votes for the parties which had taken a stand against participation in this war. Despite losses for the SPD, the Red-Green coalition government retained a very slight majority in the Bundestag (4 seats) and was renewed, with Joschka Fischer as foreign minister, Renate Künast as minister for consumer protection, nutrition and agriculture, and Jürgen Trittin as minister for the environment.

One internal issue in 2002 was the failed attempt to settle a long-standing discussion about the question of whether members of parliament should be allowed to become members of the party executive. Two party conventions declined to change the party statute. The necessary majority of two-thirds was missed by a small margin. As a result, former party chairpersons Fritz Kuhn and Claudia Roth (who had been elected to parliament that year) were no longer able to continue in their executive function and were replaced by former party secretary general Reinhard Bütikofer and former Bundestag member Angelika Beer. The party then held a member referendum on this question in the spring of 2003 which changed the party statute. Now members of parliament may be elected for two of the six seats of the party executive, as long as they are not ministers or caucus leaders. 57% of all party members voted in the member referendum, with 67% voting in favor of the change. The referendum was only the second in the history of Alliance 90/The Greens, the first having been held about the merger of the Greens and Alliance 90. In 2004, after Angelika Beer was elected to the European parliament, Claudia Roth was elected to replace her as party chair.

The only party convention in 2003 was planned for November 2003, but about 20% of the local organisations forced the federal party to hold a special party convention in Cottbus early to discuss the party position regarding Agenda 2010, a major reform of the German welfare programmes planned by Chancellor Schröder.

The November 2003 party convention was held in Dresden and decided the election platform for the 2004 European Parliament elections. The German Green list for these elections was headed by Rebecca Harms (then leader of the Green party in Lower Saxony) and Daniel Cohn-Bendit, previously Member of the European Parliament for The Greens of France. The November 2003 convention is also noteworthy because it was the first convention of a German political party ever to use an electronic voting system.

The Greens gained a record 13 of Germany's 99 seats in these elections, mainly due to the perceived competence of Green ministers in the federal government and the unpopularity of the Social Democratic Party.

In early 2005, the Greens were the target of the German Visa Affair 2005, instigated in the media by the Christian Democratic Union (CDU). At the end of April 2005, they celebrated the decommissioning of the Obrigheim nuclear power station. They also continue to support a bill for an Anti-Discrimination Law (:de: Allgemeines Gleichbehandlungsgesetz) in the Bundestag.

In May 2005, the only remaining state-level red-green coalition government lost the vote in the North Rhine-Westphalia state election, leaving only the federal government with participation of the Greens (apart from local governments). In the early 2005 federal election the party incurred very small losses and achieved 8.1% of the vote and 51 seats. However, due to larger losses of the SPD, the previous coalition no longer had a majority in the Bundestag.

2005–2021: In opposition

For almost two years after the federal election in 2005, the Greens were not part of any government at the state or federal level. In June 2007, the Greens in Bremen entered into a coalition with the Social Democratic Party (SPD) following the 2007 Bremen state election.

In April 2008, following the 2008 Hamburg state election, the Green-Alternative List (GAL) in Hamburg entered into a coalition with the Christian Democratic Union (CDU), the first such state-level coalition in Germany. Although the GAL had to agree to the deepening of the Elbe River, the construction of a new coal-fired power station and two road projects they had opposed, they also received some significant concessions from the CDU. These included reforming state schools by increasing the number of primary school educational stages, the restoration of trams as public transportation in the city-state, and more pedestrian-friendly real estate development. On 29 November 2010, the coalition collapsed, resulting in an election that was won by SPD.

Following the Saarland state election of August 2009, The Greens held the balance of power after a close election where no two-party coalitions could create a stable majority government. After negotiations, the Saarland Greens rejected the option of a left-wing 'red-red-green' coalition with the SPD and The Left (Die Linke) in order to form a centre-right state government with the CDU and Free Democratic Party (FDP), a historical first time that a Jamaica coalition has formed in German politics.

In June 2010, in the first state election following the victory of the CDU/CSU and FDP in the 2009 federal election, the "black-yellow" CDU-FDP coalition in North Rhine-Westphalia under Jürgen Rüttgers lost its majority. The Greens and the SPD came one seat short of a governing majority, but after multiple negotiations about coalitions of SPD and Greens with either the FDP or The Left, the SPD and Greens decided to form a minority government, which was possible because under the constitution of North Rhine-Westphalia a plurality of seats is sufficient to elect a minister-president. So a red-green government in a state where it was defeated under Peer Steinbrück in 2005 came into office again on 14 June 2010 with the election of Hannelore Kraft as minister-president (Cabinet Kraft I).

The Greens founded the first international chapter of a German political party in the U.S. on 13 April 2008 at the Goethe-Institut in Washington D.C. Its main goal is "to provide a platform for politically active and green-oriented German citizens, in and beyond Washington D.C., to discuss and actively participate in German Green politics. [...] to foster professional and personal exchange, channeling the outcomes towards the political discourse in Germany."

In March 2011 (two weeks after the Fukushima nuclear disaster had begun), the Greens made large gains in Rhineland-Palatinate and in Baden-Württemberg. In Baden-Württemberg they became the senior partner in a governing coalition for the first time. Winfried Kretschmann is now the first Green to serve as Minister-President of a German State (Cabinet Kretschmann I and II). Polling data from August 2011 indicated that one in five Germans supported the Greens. From 4 October 2011 to 4 September 2016, the party was represented in all state parliaments.

Like the Social Democrats, the Greens backed Chancellor Angela Merkel on most bailout votes in the German parliament during her second term, saying their pro-European stances overrode party politics. Shortly before the elections, the party plummeted to a four-year low in the polls, undermining efforts by Peer Steinbrück's Social Democrats to unseat Merkel. 
While being in opposition on the federal level since 2005, the Greens have established themselves as a powerful force in Germany's political system. By 2016, the Greens had joined 11 out of 16 state governments in a variety of coalitions. Over the years, they have built up an informal structure called G-coordination to organize interests between the federal party office, the parliamentary group in the Bundestag, and the Greens governing on the state level.

The Greens remained the smallest of six parties in the Bundestag in the 2017 federal election, winning 8.9% of votes. After the election, they entered into talks for a Jamaica coalition with the CDU and FDP. Discussions collapsed after the FDP withdrew in November.

After the federal election and unsuccessful Jamaica negotiations, the party held elections for two new co-leaders; incumbents Özdemir and Peter did not stand for re-election. Robert Habeck and Annalena Baerbock were elected with 81% and 64% of votes, respectively. Habeck had served as deputy premier and environment minister in Schleswig-Holstein since 2012, while Baerbock had been a leading figure in the party's Brandenburg branch since 2009. Their election was considered a break with tradition, as they were both members of the moderate wing.

The Greens saw a major surge in support during the Bavarian and Hessian state elections in October 2018, becoming the second largest party in both. They subsequently rose to second place behind the CDU/CSU in national polling, averaging between 17% and 20% over the next six months.

In the 2019 European Parliament election, the Greens achieved their best ever result in a national election, placing second with 20.5% of the vote and winning 21 seats. National polling released after the election showed a major boost for the party. The first poll after the election, conducted by Forsa, showed the Greens in first place on 27%. This was the first time the Greens had ever been in first place in a national opinion poll, and the first time in the history of the Federal Republic that any party other than the CDU/CSU or SPD had placed first in a national poll. This trend continued as polls from May to July showed the CDU/CSU and Greens trading first place, after which point the CDU/CSU pulled ahead once more. The Greens continued to poll in the low 20% range into early 2020.

The Greens recorded best-ever results in the Brandenburg (10.8%) and Saxony (8.6%) state elections in September 2019, and subsequently joined coalition governments in both states. They suffered an unexpected decline in the Thuringian election in October, only narrowing retaining their seats with 5.2%. In the February 2020 Hamburg state election, the Greens became the second largest party, winning 24.2% of votes cast.

In March 2021, the Greens improved their performance in Baden-Württemberg, where they remained the strongest party with 32.6% of votes, and Rhineland-Palatinate, where they moved into third place with 9.3%.

Due to their sustained position as the second most popular party in national polling ahead of the September 2021 federal election, the Greens chose to forgo the traditional dual lead-candidacy in favour of selecting a single Chancellor candidate. Co-leader Annalena Baerbock was announced as Chancellor candidate on 19 April and formally confirmed on 12 June with 98.5% approval.

The Greens surged in opinion polls in late April and May, briefly surpassing the CDU as the most popular party in the country, but their numbers slipped back after Baerbock was caught up in several controversies. Her personal popularity also fell below that of both Armin Laschet and Olaf Scholz, the Chancellor candidates for the CDU and SPD, respectively. The party's fortunes did not reverse even after the July floods, which saw climate change return as the most important issue among voters. The situation worsened in August as the SPD surged into first place to the detriment of both the CDU and Greens.

2021–present: Return to government 
The Greens finished in third place in the 2021 federal election with 14.8% of votes. Though their best ever federal election result, it was considered a bitter disappointment in light of their polling numbers during the previous three years. They entered coalition talks with the FDP and SPD, eventually joining a traffic light coalition under Chancellor Olaf Scholz which took office on 8 December 2021. The Greens have five ministers in the Scholz cabinet, including Robert Habeck as Vice-Chancellor and Annalena Baerbock as foreign minister.

Since party statute mandates that party leaders may not hold government office, Baerbock and Habeck stepped down after entering cabinet. At a party conference in January 2022, Ricarda Lang and Omid Nouripour were elected to succeed them. At the time of the her election, Lang was 28 years old, speaker for women's issues, and a former leader of the Green Youth. 46-year-old Nouripour was foreign affairs spokesman and a member of the Bundestag since 2006. Of the new leaders, Lang is considered a representative of the party's left-wing, while Nouripour represents the right-wing.

Leadership (1993–present)

Election results

Federal Parliament (Bundestag)

 Results of Alliance 90/The Greens (East) and The Greens (West)

European Parliament

State Parliaments (Länder)

Results timeline

States (Länder)

Ideology and policy
Alliance 90/The Greens is a centre-left, but it is also considered centrist.

The West German Greens played a key role in the development of green politics in Europe, with their original program outlining "four principles: ecological, social, grassroots, and non-violent." Initially ideologically heterogenous, the party took up a position on the radical left in its early years, which were dominated by conflicts between the more left-wing "Fundi" (fundamentalist) and more moderate "Realo" (realist) factions. These conflicts became less significant as the party moved toward the political mainstream in the 1990s.

In the 21st century, the Alliance 90/The Greens is classified as the most centrist of Germany's left-wing parties. The party has a more moderate approach to workers' rights or economic policy than the SPD. They have a similar voter base to the FDP. Their supporters are younger, politically centrist professionals living in cities, unmoored both from the traditional working-class voter base of the SPD and the traditional Christian voter base of the CDU. They are focusing on environmentalist and socially progressive policies. Emphasis is placed on mitigating climate change, reducing carbon emissions, and fostering sustainability and environmentally-friendly practices. They support equality, social justice, and humanitarian responses to events such as the European migrant crisis. Their fiscal platform is flexible and seeks to balance social, economic, and environmental interests. The party is strongly pro-European, advocating European federalism, and promotes wider international cooperation, including strengthening existing alliances.

Starting from the leadership of Annalena Baerbock and Robert Habeck, commentators have observed the Greens taking a pragmatic, moderate approach to work with parties from across the political spectrum. Baerbock described their stances and style as a form of "radical realism" attempting to reconcile principles with practical politics. At the same time, the party has denounced populism and division, and placed rhetorical emphasis on optimism and cross-party cooperation. Accompanied by record high popularity and election results, this led some to suggest that the Greens were filling a gap in the political centre left by the declining popularity of the CDU/CSU and SPD.

Drug policy
The party supports the legalization and regulation of cannabis and is the sponsor of the proposed German cannabis control bill.

Foreign policy
The Greens are regarded as taking a centrist line on defense and pushing for a stronger common EU foreign policy, especially against Russia and China. Green Party co-leader Annalena Baerbock has proposed a post-pacifist foreign policy. She supports eastward expansion of NATO and has considered the number of UN resolutions critical of Israel as "absurd compared to resolutions against other states." The party's program included references to NATO as an "indispensable" part of European security. The Greens have promised to abolish the contested Nord Stream 2 pipeline to ship Russian natural gas to Germany. The party criticized the EU's investment deal with China. In 2016, the Greens criticised Germany's defense plan with Saudi Arabia, which has been waging war in Yemen and has been accused of massive human rights violations.

The party remains divided over issues such as nuclear disarmament and U.S. nuclear weapons on German territory. Some Greens want Germany to sign the United Nations' Treaty on the Prohibition of Nuclear Weapons.

Energy and nuclear power

Ever since the party's inception, The Greens have been concerned with the immediate halt of construction or operation of all nuclear power stations. As an alternative, they promote a shift to non-nuclear renewable energy and a comprehensive program of energy conservation.

In 1986, large parts of Germany were covered with radioactive contamination from the Chernobyl disaster and Germans went to great lengths to deal with the contamination. Germany's anti-nuclear stance was strengthened. From the mid-1990s onwards, anti-nuclear protests were primarily directed against transports of radioactive waste in "CASTOR" containers.

After the Chernobyl disaster, the Greens became more radicalised and resisted compromise on the nuclear issue. During the 1990s, a re-orientation towards a moderate program occurred, with concern about global warming and ozone depletion taking a more prominent role. During the federal red-green government (1998–2005) many people became disappointed with what they saw as excessive compromise on key Greens policies.

Energy policy is still the most important cross-cutting issue in climate and economic policies. Implementation of Green Policy would see electricity generation from 100 percent renewable sources as early as 2040. The development of renewable energy and combined heat and power is also a great opportunity for technical and economic innovation. Solar industry and environmental technologies are already a significant part of key industries providing jobs which need to be developed and promoted vigorously. In addition, a priority of green energy policy is increasing the thermal insulation and energy efficiency of homes, the phaseout of all nuclear energy generation with possible high-efficiency gas-fired power plants operational during the transition phase.

Environment and climate policy
The central idea of green politics is sustainable development. The concept of environmental protection is the cornerstone of Alliance 90/The Greens policy. In particular, the economic, energy and transport policy claims are in close interaction with environmental considerations. The Greens acknowledge the natural environment as a high priority and animal protection should be enshrined as a national objective in constitutional law. An effective environmental policy would be based on a common environmental code, with the urgent integration of a climate change bill. During the red-green coalition (1998–2005) a policy of agricultural change was launched labeled as a paradigm shift in agricultural policy towards a more ecological friendly agriculture, which needs to continue.

The Greens have praised the European Green Deal, which aims to make the EU climate neutral by 2050. Climate change is at the center of all policy considerations. This includes environmental policy and safety and social aspects. The plans of the Alliance 90/The Greens provide a climate change bill laying down binding reductions to greenhouse gas emissions in Germany by 2020 restricting emissions to minus 40 percent compared to 1990.

European Union 
Alliance 90/The Greens supports the eventual federalization of the European Union into a Federal European Republic (German: Föderale Europäische Republik), i.e. a single federal European sovereign state.

Transport

A similarly high priority is given to transport policy. The switch from a traveling allowance to a mobility allowance, which is paid regardless of income to all employees, replacing company car privileges. The truck toll will act as a climate protection instrument internalizing the external costs of transport. Railway should be promoted in order to achieve the desired environmental objectives and the comprehensive care of customers. The railway infrastructure is to remain permanently in the public sector, allowing a reduction in expenditure on road construction infrastructure. The Greens want to control privileges on kerosene and for international flights, introduce an air ticket levy. Restrict speeds nationwide on the highways to 120 km/h and country roads to 80 km/h. The Greens want to create a market incentive and research program of  €500 million annually to ensure that by 2020 there are at least two million electric cars on German roads.

Welfare, health, family and education

For many years, the Green Party has advocated against the "Ehegattensplitting" policy, under which the incomes of married couples are split for taxation purposes. Furthermore, the Party advocates for a massive increase in federal spending for places in preschools, and for increased investment in education: an additional 1 billion Euros for vocational schools and 200 million Euros more BAföG (Bundesausbildungsförderungsgesetz in German, approximately translated to "the Federal Law for the Advancement of Education") for adults.

In its 2013 platform, the Green Party successfully advocated for a minimum wage of 8.50 Euro per hour, which was implemented on 1 January 2015. It continues to press for higher minimum wages.

The Greens want the starting retirement age to remain 67, but with some qualificationsfor example, a provision for partial retirement.

The Greens advocate decriminalizing marijuana usage and the private growing of plants. Furthermore, the Greens support research on the drug and the use of marijuana for medicinal purposes.

Women and LGBTQIA+ rights

The Green Party supports the implementation of quotas in executive boards, the policy of equal pay for equal work, and continuing the fight against domestic violence. According to its website, the Green Party "fights for the acceptance and against the exclusion of homosexuals, bisexuals, intersex- and transgender people and others".

In order to recognize the political persecution that LGBT+ people face abroad, the Green Party wants to extend asylum to LGBTQIA+ people abroad. The policy change was sponsored primarily by Volker Beck, one of the Party's most prominent gay members. Because of the extensive support the Green Party has given the LGBTQIA+ community since its conception, many LGBTQIA+ people vote for the Green Party even if their political ideology does not quite align otherwise.

Electorate

A 2000 study by the Infratest Dimap political research company has suggested the Green voter demographic includes those on higher incomes (e.g. above €2000/month) and the party's support is less among households with lower incomes. The same polling research also concluded that the Greens received fewer votes from the unemployed and general working population, with business people favouring the party as well as the centre-right liberal Free Democratic Party. According to Infratest Dimap the Greens received more voters from the age group 34–42 than any other age group and that the young were generally more supportive of the party than the old. (Source: Intrafest Dimap political research company for the ARD.)

The Greens have a higher voter demographic in urban areas than rural areas, except for a small number of rural areas with pressing local environmental concerns, such as strip mining or radioactive waste deposits. The cities of Bonn, Cologne, Stuttgart, Berlin, Hamburg, Frankfurt and Munich have among the highest percentages of Green voters in the country. The towns of Aachen, Bonn, Darmstadt, Hanover, Mönchengladbach and Wuppertal have Green mayors. The party has a lower level of support in the states of the former German Democratic Republic (East Germany); nonetheless, the party is currently represented in every state landtag except Saarland.

See also 
 Anti-nuclear movement
 Green party
 Green Party faction (Bundestag)
 Green Youth (Germany)
 List of German Green Party politicians
 List of political parties in Germany
 Radical centrism#Germany

Notes

References

Further reading 

Kolinsky, Eva (1989): The Greens in West Germany: Organisation and Policy Making Oxford: Berg.
Nishida, Makoto (2005): Strömungen in den Grünen (1980–2003) : eine Analyse über informell-organisierte Gruppen innerhalb der Grünen Münster: Lit, 
 
Raschke, Joachim (1993): Die Grünen: Wie sie wurden, was sie sind. Köln: Bund-Verlag.
Raschke, Joachim (2001): Die Zukunft der Grünen. Frankfurt am Main / New York: Campus.
Stifel, Andreas (2018): Vom erfolgreichen Scheitern einer Bewegung – Bündnis 90/Die Grünen als politische Partei und soziokulturelles Phänomen. Wiesbaden: VS Springer.

Wiesenthal, Helmut (2000): "Profilkrise und Funktionswandel. Bündnis 90/Die Grünen auf dem Weg zu einem neuen Selbstverständnis", in Aus Politik und Zeitgeschichte, B5 2000, S. 22–29.

External links

Official Homepage of Bündnis 90/Die Grünen
European Green Party information on Bündnis 90/Die Grünen
"German Greens and Pax Europa" (English) The Nation article about Green foreign policy
The Rise of the Green Party – slideshow by Der Spiegel

 
1980 establishments in West Germany
1983 in the environment
Centre-left parties in Europe
Centrist parties in Germany
Environmentalism in Germany
European Green Party
Global Greens member parties
Green liberalism
Green political parties in Germany
Liberal parties in Germany
Organisations based in Berlin
Parties represented in the European Parliament
Political parties established in 1980
Progressive parties
Progressivism in Germany
Social liberal parties